Pakistan participated in the 2002 Asian Games in Busan, South Korea held from September 29 to October 14, 2002.

Medallists

Hockey
Pakistan placed fourth in these games. It lost to India in the semifinals and Malaysia in the bronze medal match.

Kabaddi

Squash

References

Nations at the 2002 Asian Games
2002
Asian Games